Ghassani may refer to
the Ghassanids
or people with the given name Ghassan
or to
Abul Qasim ibn Mohammed al-Ghassani
Mohammed ibn abd al-Wahab al-Ghassani